Laemodonta is a genus of small air-breathing, saltmarsh snails, terrestrial pulmonate gastropod mollusks in the family Ellobiidae.

Description
(Description as Plecotrema) The solid shell has an ovate-conic shape and is umbilicated. The acute spire is elevated. The oblong aperture is contracted. The inner lip shows three plaits, the middle one bifid. The outer lip has a marginal varix and is  internally bidentate.

Species 
Species within the genus Laemodonta include:
 Laemodonta amplicata C. F. Jickeli, 1874
 Laemodonta bella (H. Adams & A. Adams, 1855)
 † Laemodonta bourgeoisi (Tournouër, 1870) 
 Laemodonta clausa (H. Adams & A. Adams, 1854)
 Laemodonta cubensis (Pfeiffer, 1854)
 † Laemodonta delaunayi (Tournouër, 1870) 
 Laemodonta exarata (H. Adams & A. Adams, 1854)
 Laemodonta exaratoides Kawabe, 1992
 Laemodonta hirsuta (Garrett, 1872)
 Laemodonta livida Perugia, 2010
 Laemodonta madagascariensis Bozzetti, 2007
 Laemodonta minuta (Möllendorff, 1885)
 Laemodonta monilifera (H. Adams & A. Adams, 1854)
 Laemodonta oblonga Jickeli, 1874
 Laemodonta octanfracta (Jonas, 1845)
 Laemodonta punctatostriata (H. Adams & A. Adams, 1854)
 Laemodonta punctigera (H. Adams & A. Adams, 1853)
 Laemodonta rapax (Dohrn, 1860)
 Laemodonta siamensis (Morelet, 1875)
 Laemodonta typica (H. & A. Adams, 1854)
Species brought into synonymy
 Laemodonta affinis (Férussac, 1821) : synonym of Pedipes affinis Férussac, 1821
 Laemodonta bronni' (sic)': synonym of Allochroa bronnii (Philippi, 1846)
 Laemodonta ciliata (Tate, 1879): synonym of Laemodonta octanfracta (Jonas, 1845)
 Laemodonta conica (Pease, 1863): synonym of Allochroa layardi (H. Adams & A. Adams, 1855)
 Laemodonta exigua (H. Adams, 1867): synonym of Laemodonta bella (H. Adams & A. Adams, 1855)
 Laemodonta striata (Philippi, 1846): synonym of Laemodonta octanfracta (Jonas, 1845)

References

 Zilch, A. 1959. Euthyneura. In, Schindewolf, O.H. (ed.). Handbuch der Paläozoologie. Berlin-Zehlendorf : Bornträger Vol. 6(2)(2) xii 834 pp.
 Vaught, K.C. (1989). A classification of the living Mollusca''. American Malacologists: Melbourne, FL (USA). . XII, 195 pp.
 Smith B.J. (1992). Non-marine Mollusca. In: Houston W.W.K. (ed.) Zoological Catalogue of Australia, volume 8. xii + 405 pp

External links 

 Adams, H. & Adams, A. (1854). Monograph of Plecotrema, a new genus of gasteropodous mollusks, belonging to the family Auriculidae, from specimens in the collection of Hugh Cuming, Esq. Proceedings of the Zoological Society of London. (1853) 21: 120-122
  Möllendorff, O. F. von. (1898). Verzeichnis der auf den Philippinen lebenden Landmollusken. Abhandlungen der Naturforschenden Gesellschaft zu Görlitz. 22: 26-208
 Morgan J. de. (1917). Observations sur les Auriculidés du Falunien de la Touraine. Bulletin de la Société Géologique de France. ser. 4, 16: 21-49

Ellobiidae